The Preacher's Son is the fourth studio album by Haitian rapper Wyclef Jean, released on November 4, 2003. The album, which was co-produced by Jean and long-time collaborator Jerry 'Wonda' Duplessis, combines elements of hip hop, reggae and reggae fusion, and uses a number of samples, including the Motown-inspired "Industry", which samples "What Becomes of the Brokenhearted". The album contains guest appearances of the likes of Missy Elliott, Patti LaBelle, Rah Digga and Redman, as well as a guitar feature by Carlos Santana on the song "Three Nights In Rio".

Three singles were released from the album. The lead single, "Party to Damascus", was the only single served to international radio. "Industry" served as a European-only single, with some territories, including Germany, releasing it as a double A-side with "Party to Damascus". "Take Me As I Am" was released as a U.S. radio single in March 2004, with a new "Urban Remix" being serviced to certain radio stations.

Critical reception 

AllMusic editor Rob Theakston felt that the album "finds Wyclef re-energized right from the opening moments [...] Preacher's Son doesn't let up there either thanks to an armada of guest cameos from Patti LaBelle, Redman, Carlos Santana, Scarface, and Monica, just to name a few. And unlike most rap albums, which rely on these guest appearances to carry the weight of the record's impact, these contributions only complement the stellar songwriting, arrangements, and production style that has made Wyclef one of the most in-demand producers of the 2000s and '90s. As with most records, there's a bit of filler that could be trimmed to make a great record into a phenomenal one, but it's easy to forgive when the quality is so high. The Preacher's Son is a welcome return to form and easily one of the biggest highlights of Wyclef's career."

Track listing

Charts

References 

2003 albums
Albums produced by Wyclef Jean
Wyclef Jean albums
J Records albums
Albums produced by Jerry Duplessis